The symmetric logarithmic derivative is an important quantity in quantum metrology, and is related to the quantum Fisher information.

Definition

Let  and  be two operators, where  is Hermitian and positive semi-definite.

The symmetric logarithmic derivative  is defined implicitly by the equation

Explicitly, it is given by

Formally, the map from operator  to operator  is a (linear) superoperator.

Properties

The symmetric logarithmic derivative is linear in :

The symmetric logarithmic derivative is Hermitian if its argument  is Hermitian:

The derivative of the expression  w.r.t.  at  reads

Further, we obtain the Taylor expansion
.

References

Quantum information science
Quantum optics